The Little Sequatchie River is a  tributary of the Sequatchie River in Tennessee.  Unlike its larger namesake, it does not have a spectacular large spring source but is the result of the confluence of many smaller streams in a very remote, scenic area of the Cumberland Plateau along the line between Grundy County and Marion County.  It flows down a narrow valley, basically south.  Its mouth is near the community of Sequatchie (also rendered "Sequachee").

See also
List of rivers of Tennessee

References

Rivers of Tennessee
Rivers of Grundy County, Tennessee
Rivers of Marion County, Tennessee